Thengai Srinivasan (21 October 1937 – 9 November 1987) was an Indian actor who appeared in Tamil-language films and plays from the 1960s to the 1980s. He was given the prefix Thengai (coconut) after his role as a coconut-seller in the play Kal Manam. Although originally a comedian, he also performed in other genres and enacted several lead and antagonistic roles.

Early life 
Srinivasan was born to Rajavel Mudaliar (Chennai) and Subammal (Srivaikuntam in Tuticorin district) on 21 October 1937. He had two sisters. When he was seven years old, his family moved to Chennai. Srinivasan's father was an artist who staged several plays and it was his influence which stimulated Srinivasan's interest in an acting career.

After school, Srinivasan joined the Integral Coach Factory in Chennai and later started his theatrical career in the Railway Dramatic Club. Srinivasan's first stage appearance was in his father's drama Galatta Kalyanam. Srinivasan was also part of the troupe of K. Kannan and portrayed a coconut vendor in one of his plays Kal Manam. Comedian K. A. Thangavelu upon watching the play, announced he should be called Thengai (coconut) Srinivasan thereafter.

Career 
Srinivasan's first feature film was the mystery thriller Oru Viral in 1965. The film, which saw him playing a detective, was a financial success. Srinivasan was, however, supposed to make his feature film debut in Iravum Pagalum (1965) that marked the acting debut of Jaishankar, but was dropped after distributors raised concerns about two newcomers being featured in the lead roles. He and Jaishankar nonetheless would become close friends later and Srinivasan was featured in almost 80 per cent of Jaishankar's early films.

Srinivasan mostly enacted the role of a comedian or a sidekick. Notable roles in his subsequent career include that of a fake Swami and that of an idealistic industrialist in the cult comedy films Kasethan Kadavulada and Thillu Mullu, respectively. In 2013, Forbes India included his performance in Thillu Mullu, along with that of Rajinikanth in the same film, in its list of the "25 Greatest Acting Performances of Indian Cinema". Srinivasan also played antagonistic roles; one of which was that of a blackmailing photographer in S. P. Muthuraman's Mayangukiral Oru Maadhu.

He played the lead in Vaali's play Sri Krishna Vijayam, which was later made into a feature film named Kaliyuga Kannan. The makers originally intended to cast Sivaji Ganesan in the role, but Ganesan, being impressed by Srinivasan's performance in the play, suggested that Srinivasan may be retained for the film version. Kaliyuga Kannan went on to become a high commercial success and is considered one of Srinivasan's most notable films. Other films featuring Srinivasan in the lead role were Nandri Karangal, Sri Ramajayam, Porter Ponnusami and Adukku Malli, which was a box office success. In 1987, Srinivasan produced the film Krishnan Vandhaan with Sivaji Ganesan in the lead. The film did not fare well and got him into deep financial trouble.

Death 
When Srinivasan went to Bangalore, Karnataka to attend the rituals following his aunt's death, he suffered a brain haemorrhage. Despite intensive treatment, he died on 9 November 1987. His body was brought to his house at Ramasamy Street in Gopalapuram, Chennai. His death was marked by tributes from film fans and industry insiders alike.

Personal life 
Srinivasan was married to Lakshmi. The couple have two daughters – Geethalakshmi and Rajeshwari – and a son, Shivshankar. Geethalakshmi's son Yogi has acted in films such as Azhagiya Asura (2006) and Sivi (2007), and Shivshankar's daughter Shrutika also appeared in a few Tamil films during the 2000s. Shivshankar's son Adithya Shivpink is also an actor, having starred in films featuring Rajinikanth since 2018.

Filmography 
This is a partial filmography. You can expand it.

1960s

1970s

1980s

References

Bibliography

External links 
 

1937 births
1987 deaths
20th-century comedians
20th-century Indian male actors
Indian male comedians
Indian male film actors
Indian Tamil people
Male actors from Tamil Nadu
Tamil comedians
Tamil male actors